Dang is a village in Amariya Block of Pilibhit district in Uttar Pradesh, India. Dang is a leading rice manufacturer in Pilibhit. And also Dang District (Nepali: दाङ जिल्ला, [daŋ]) is a district of Lumbini Province located in the Inner Terai of midwestern Nepal. Deukhuri valley of the district is the capital of the province and is the second largest valley of Asia surrounded by Sivalik Hills and Mahabharata Range. The district headquarter Ghorahi is the seventh largest city and the largest sub-metropolitan city of Nepal. Tulsipur sub-metropolitan city, the second largest city of Dang, is a major transportation hub with an extensive road and air networks. The district covers an area of 2,955 km² and has a population of 548,141 (2011 census).[1]

See also 
 Dang District, Gujarat

References 

Villages in Pilibhit district